Zvonko Čoh (born 7 August 1956) is a Slovene painter, illustrator, and animator, best known as the co-author (together with Milan Erič) of the first Slovene animated feature length film (i.e. the 1998 Socialization of a Bull). He has illustrated over thirty books for children and teenagers and made over twenty short animated films.

Čoh was born in Celje in 1956. He graduated from the Academy of Fine Arts in Ljubljana in 1980 and has since worked as a free-lance artist. As an illustrator he collaborates with many publishers in Slovenia and his illustrations also appear in magazines for children and young readers. He has made a number of short animated films and in 1998 he also created the first Slovene feature length animated film titled Socializacija bika? (Socialisation of a Bull) with the artist Milan Erič.

He won the Levstik Award twice, in 1988 for his illustrations in Račka Puhačka and Rastoče težave Jadrana Krta (The Fluffy Duckling and The Growing Pains of Adrian Mole) and in 1999 for his illustrations for the book children's folk limericks Enci benci na kamenci.

Selected Illustrated Works
 Kekec in Pehta (Kekec and Pehta), written by Josip Vandot, 2011
 Deseti brat, Hamlet, Drakula in drugi (The Tenth Brother, Hamlet, Dracula and others), written by Marjan Kovačevič Beltram, 2011
 Žiga špaget gre v širni svet (Žiga the Spaghetti Goes Out Into The Wide World), written by Aksinja Kermauner, 2010
 Odisejada in druge zgodbe (The Osyssey and Other Stories), written by Marjan Kovačevič Beltram, 2006
 Najlepše pravljice 2 (Most Beautiful Fairy Tales 2), 2009
 Dogodek v mestnem logu (An Events in an Urban Forest), written by Helena Koncut Kraljič, 2009
 Listko in njegova življenja (Little Leaf and His Lives ), written by Helena Koncut Kraljič, 2009
 Kako sta se gospod in gospa pomirila (How Mr and Mrs Calmed Down), written by Miklavž Komelj, 2009
 Stonoga Tina (Tina the Centipede), written by Helena Koncut Kraljič, 2008
 Samovo potovanje v deželo svetlobe (Sam's Journey into the Land of Light), written by Helena Koncut Kraljič, 2008
 Štiri črne mravljice (Four Black Ants), written by Anja Štefan, 2007
 Obuti maček (Puss in Boots), written by Charles Perrault, 2003

References

Artists from Celje
Slovenian illustrators
Slovenian animators
Slovenian animated film directors
Living people
1956 births
Levstik Award laureates
University of Ljubljana alumni